Latur–Mumbai Chhatrapati Shivaji Maharaj Terminus Superfast Express is a Superfast Express trains in India train belonging to Indian Railways that runs between Chhatrapati Shivaji Maharaj Terminus, Mumbai and  in India. It is a daily service. It operates as train number 22107 from Chhatrapati Shivaji Maharaj Terminus, Mumbai to Latur and as train number 22108 in the reverse direction.

Coaches

22107/22108 Latur Express presently has 1 AC 1st Class cum AC 2 tier, 1 AC 2 tier cum AC 3 tier, 2 AC 3 tier, 6 Sleeper class & 8 General Unreserved coaches.

As with most train services in India, coach composition may be amended at the discretion of Indian Railways depending on demand.

Service

The 22107/Mumbai Chhatrapati Shivaji Maharaj Terminus–Latur Superfast Express covers the distance of 530 kilometres in 9 hours 30 mins (55.79 km/hr) & 9 hours 25 mins as 22108/Latur–Mumbai Chhatrapati Shivaji Maharaj Terminus Superfast Express (55.8053 km/hr).

As the average speed of the train is above , as per Indian Railways rules, its fare includes a Superfast surcharge.

Traction

It is a total diesel haul end to end. Usually a WDG-3A or WDP-4D locomotive from the  Shed hauls the train.

Schedule

This daily service departs Chhatrapati Shivaji Maharaj Terminus, Mumbai as Latur Express at 21:00 hrs IST and arrives  at 06:30 hrs IST the next day. In return journey, the train departs  as Mumbai Express at 22:30 hrs IST and arrives Chhatrapati Shivaji Maharaj Terminus, Mumbai at 08:05 hrs IST the next day.

Route

External links 
 Running status

Transport in Mumbai
Express trains in India
Rail transport in Maharashtra